Dato' Richard Ho Ung Hun (20 January 1927 – 4 February 2008) was a Malaysian civil servant. In the course of his career, he served as a barrister, member of parliament (MP), cabinet minister, chairman of Maybank Finance and deputy chairman of Malayan Banking, and as a director of several publicly listed companies in Malaysia.

Early life and legal career
Ho was born in Sitiawan, Perak. His father was a preacher. He began his career as a teacher. He later joined the public service under the colonial British government as a court interpreter.

After resigning as an Assistant District Officer in Malacca in his early 30s, Ho left for the United Kingdom where he pursued his law degree, being called as a barrister of the Lincoln's Inn in England in 1961, at the age of 34. The same year Ho was called to the High Court of Malaya as an advocate and solicitor.

Political career
In 1969, in what was considered a feat, Ho, then 42, stood as a "favourite son of Sitiawan" under the opposition Democratic Action Party (DAP) ticket and successfully wrested the ruling Alliance coalition's blue ribbon Sitiawan parliamentary seat from Kam Woon Wah, the secretary-general of the then powerful Malaysian Chinese Association (MCA), a senior partner of the governing Alliance (later became National Front or Barisan Nasional in 1973) coalition.

Later Ho together with another DAP's MP Walter Loh Poh Khan of Setapak, had crossed over to MCA on 18 May 1972.

Ho successfully retained the formerly Sitiawan which was renamed as Lumut) seat where the Royal Malaysian Navy base is located in the 1974) and 1978 general elections for the ruling National Front coalition as he moved up the political ladder from the age of 47 as Deputy Works Minister and later Deputy Minister of Road Transport (1974), Deputy Finance Minister (1976), Minister in the Prime Minister's Department (1977-1978) and Minister of Labour and Manpower (1978-1982).

Ho was dropped in 1982 general election as the ruling coalition's candidate in an intra-MCA intrigue involving powerful forces who finally removed MCA president Dato’ (as he then was, later Tan Sri) Lee San Choon, also a Cabinet Minister.

This was despite Ho, who had earlier married at the age of 55, having steadily moved up the MCA ladder till becoming the MCA deputy president to Lee by then. Dato’ Lee, believing his ambitious aides that Ho's active traversing the country meant he was eyeing his top job, was used by them who actually eyed Tan Sri Lee's job.

According to his confidante and close friend of more than 40 years standing, newspaper editor-turned-New Zealand-trained lawyer Tan Ban Cheng of Penang, “Dato’ Ho never wanted to be MCA president. He moved into his position as deputy by the force of circumstance and had always supported Tan Sri Lee.”

An insider noted that it was Ho's resignation as MCA deputy president the very day after Nomination Day for the 1982 general election that triggered the fight between the academician and incumbent Cabinet Minister Dato’ Neo Yee Pan and businessman Tan Koon Swan factions.

Unable to resolve the claims of the contending ambitions of the Tan and Neo factions, Tan Sri Lee resigned in 1983, sending the MCA into an almost three-year-long crisis that culminated in the eventual rise of Dr (now Tun Dato Seri Dr) Ling Liong Sik over the ambitious Datuk Neo and architect and incumbent Cabinet Minister Datuk Mak Hon Kam both of whom fell out as the crisis widened.

Post political career
In late 1982, already out of the political arena, Ho was appointed concurrently as the vice-chairman of the Maybank board and chairman of its finance subsidiary.

Ho's confidante, Mr. Tan, described Ho as "a man of many parts, always humble, approachable, helpful and caring." Ho, said Penang-based Tan, showed his talents as a linguist, politician, public administrator and banker – “his last role as banker acquired at the age of 56 needed a steep learning curve.”

Personal life
Ho married Datin Mary Heng when he was 55. The couple had two children, Ignatius and Cecelia. He died at the age of 81, on February 4, 2008.

Election results

Honours
 :
 Knight Commander of the Order of the Perak State Crown (DPMP) – Dato' (1978)

See also
 Sitiawan (federal constituency)
 Lumut (federal constituency)

References

1927 births
2008 deaths
Government ministers of Malaysia
20th-century Malaysian lawyers
Members of Lincoln's Inn
Malaysian politicians of Chinese descent
People from Sitiawan
People from Perak
Former Democratic Action Party (Malaysia) politicians
Malaysian Chinese Association politicians
Members of the Dewan Rakyat